Ralph the Staller (or Ralf the Englishman  (died 1069/70) was a noble and landowner in both Anglo-Saxon and post-Conquest England. He first appears in charters from Brittany, where he was described as Ralf the Englishman, and it was in Brittany that his son Ralf de Gaël held a large hereditary lordship.

The exact nature of his connections to England and Brittany are uncertain. Although he was clearly present in England before 1066 his name Ralf (Radulphus, Rauf etc) was continental, and not English. The Anglo-saxon chronicle contrasts him with his un-named wife, which it describes as a Breton, saying that he was born in Norfolk, while both the Norman writer William of Malmesbury and the chronicle of the abbey of Saint-Riquier in France, where he made a grant, described Ralph the staller as a Breton. Modern historians such as Ann Williams have suggested that his father came to England with Emma of Normandy when she married Aethelred II in 1002. She suggest that his mother was English, thus accounting for relatives with Anglo-Saxon names, mentioned in Domesday Book.

Ralf was part of the court of Edward the Confessor, and is sometimes referred to as "squire", a generic title for important members of the royal court at the time, he is also designated as seneschal and courtier. He held the military post of staller, roughly equivalent to the continental constable, under King Edward the Confessor.

He is recorded as witnessing charters, for instance in 1053, as a staller, and in 1053-55 he attested a charter between Earl Leofric and Godgifu, endowing a monastery at Stowe, St Mary in Lincolnshire.

He survived partaking in the Conquest of 1066 and gained the favour of William the Conqueror, who made him Earl of East Anglia. He married and had several children, including his heir, Ralph Guader, who succeeded to his earldom and Hardouin (French) or Hardwin (in English). He is also believed to be related to Hereward the Wake who had connections with Petersbourgh Abbey and Abbot Brand.

References

Further reading

Keats-Rohan, Katharine S.B (2016). "Raoul l'Anglais et Raoul de Gaël: un réexamen des données anglaises et bretonnes" Mémoires de la Société d'Histoire et d'Archéolgie de Bretagne. pp. 63–93. https://www.academia.edu/26605351

1010s births
1068 deaths
Year of birth uncertain
11th-century English nobility
Anglo-Normans
Earls of East Anglia
People from Norfolk
11th-century Breton people